Freya Nicole Christie (born 8 November 1997) is a British tennis player.

Up to date, she has won 18 doubles titles on the ITF Women's Circuit.

On 6 June 2016, Christie made her WTA Tour debut at the Nottingham Open, losing in the first round to Zheng Saisai, 4–6, 2–6.

Grand Slam performance timelines

Singles

Doubles

ITF finals

Singles: 5 (5 runner–ups)

Doubles: 32 (19 titles, 13 runner–ups)

Notes

References

External links
 
 

1997 births
Living people
Sportspeople from Nottingham
British female tennis players
English female tennis players
Tennis people from Nottinghamshire

People from Hucknall
Sportspeople from Nottinghamshire
21st-century British women